Tazeh Kand (also Romanized as Tāzeh Kand) is a village in Baruq Rural District, in the Central District of Heris County, East Azerbaijan Province, Iran. At the 2006 census, its population was 18, in 6 families.

References 

Populated places in Heris County